Parachaea is a genus of moths of the family Erebidae. The genus was erected by George Hampson in 1926.

Species
Parachaea despagnesi Guenée, 1852
Parachaea macaria Cramer, 1777

References

Calpinae